The A-Team is an American action-adventure television series that ran on NBC from January 1983 to March 1987 about former members of a fictitious United States Army Special Forces unit. The four members of the team were tried by court martial for a crime they had not committed. They were convicted and sentenced to serve terms in a military prison, but later escaped to Los Angeles and began working as soldiers of fortune, while trying to clear their names and avoid capture by law enforcement and military authorities. The series was created by Stephen J. Cannell and Frank Lupo. A feature film based on the series was released by 20th Century Fox in 2010.

History

The A-Team was created by writers and producers Stephen J. Cannell and Frank Lupo at the behest of Brandon Tartikoff, NBC's Entertainment president. Cannell was fired from ABC in the early 1980s, after failing to produce a hit show for the network, and was hired by NBC; his first project was The A-Team.  Brandon Tartikoff pitched the series to Cannell as a combination of The Dirty Dozen, Mission Impossible, The Magnificent Seven, Mad Max, and Hill Street Blues, with "Mr. T driving the car".

The A-Team was not generally expected to become a hit, although Cannell has said that George Peppard suggested it would be a huge hit "before we ever turned on a camera". The show became very popular; the first regular episode, which aired after Super Bowl XVII on January 30, 1983, reached 26.4% of the television audience, placing fourth in the top 10 Nielsen-rated shows.

The show remains prominent in popular culture for its cartoonish violence (in which people were seldom seriously hurt, despite the frequent use of automatic rifles and explosives), formulaic episodes, its characters' ability to quickly construct ad-hoc weaponry and vehicles out of seemingly-random parts, and its distinctive theme tune. The show boosted the career of Mr. T, who portrayed the character of B. A. Baracus, around whom the show was initially conceived. Some of the show's catchphrases, such as "I love it when a plan comes together", "Hannibal's on the jazz", and "I ain't gettin' on no plane!" have appeared on T-shirts and other merchandise.

The term "A-Team" is a nickname coined for U.S. Special Forces' Operational Detachments Alpha (ODA) during the Vietnam War.

In a Yahoo! survey of 1,000 television viewers published in October 2003, The A-Team was voted the "oldie" television show viewers would most like to see revived, beating such popular television series from the 1980s as The Dukes of Hazzard and Knight Rider.

Plot

The A-Team is an episodic show, with few overarching stories, except the characters' continuing motivation to clear their names, with few references to events in past episodes and a recognizable and steady episode structure. In describing the ratings drop that occurred during the show's fourth season, reviewer Gold Burt points to this structure as being a leading cause for the decreased popularity "because the same basic plot had been used over and over again for the past four seasons with the same predictable outcome". Similarly, reporter Adrian Lee called the plots "stunningly simple" in a 2006 article for The Express (UK newspaper), citing such recurring elements "as BA's fear of flying, and outlandish finales when the team fashioned weapons from household items". The show became emblematic of this kind of "fit-for-TV warfare" due to its depiction of high-octane combat scenes, with lethal weapons, wherein the participants (with the notable exception of General Fulbright) are never killed and rarely seriously injured (see also On-screen violence section).

As the television ratings of The A-Team fell dramatically during the fourth season, the format was changed for the show's final season in 1986–87 in a bid to win back viewers. After years on the run from the authorities, the A-Team is finally apprehended by the military. General Hunt Stockwell (Robert Vaughn), a mysterious CIA operative, propositions them to work for him. In exchange, he will arrange for their pardons upon successful completion of several suicide missions. To do so, the A-Team must first escape from their captivity. With the help of a new character named Frankie "Dishpan Man" Santana who helped the group in Vietnam and who, like Murdock, was not arrested, Stockwell fakes their deaths before a military firing squad. The new status of the A-Team, no longer working for themselves, remained for the duration of the fifth season while Eddie Velez and Robert Vaughn received star billing along with the principal cast. The missions that the team had to perform in season five were somewhat reminiscent of Mission: Impossible, and based more around political espionage than beating local thugs, also usually taking place in foreign countries, including successfully overthrowing an island dictator, the rescue of a scientist from East Germany, and recovering top secret Star Wars defense information from Soviet hands. These changes proved unsuccessful with viewers, however, and ratings continued to decline. Only 13 episodes aired in the fifth season. In what was supposed to be the final episode, "The Grey Team" (although "Without Reservations" was broadcast on NBC as the last first-run episode in March 1987 for some unknown reason), Hannibal, after being misled by Stockwell one time too many, tells him that the team will no longer work for him. At the end, the team discusses what they were going to do if they get their pardon, and it is implied that they would continue doing what they were doing as the A-Team. The character of Howling Mad Murdock can be seen in the final scene wearing a T-shirt that says, "Fini".

Connections to the Vietnam War
During the Vietnam War, the A-Team were members of the 5th Special Forces Group (see the episode "West Coast Turnaround"). In the episode "Bad Time on the Border", Colonel John "Hannibal" Smith (George Peppard), indicated that the A-Team were "ex-Green Berets". During the Vietnam War, the A-Team's commanding officer, Colonel Morrison, gave them orders to rob the Bank of Hanoi to help bring the war to an end. They succeeded in their mission, but on their return to base four days after the end of the war, they discovered that Morrison had been killed by the Viet Cong, and that his headquarters had been burned to the ground. This meant that the proof that the A-Team members were acting under orders had been destroyed. They were arrested, and imprisoned at Fort Bragg, from which they quickly escaped before they were to go to trial.

The origin of the A-Team is directly linked to the Vietnam War, during which the team formed. The show's introduction in the first four seasons mentions this, accompanied by images of soldiers coming out of a helicopter in an area resembling a forest or jungle. Besides this, The A-Team would occasionally feature an episode in which the team came across an old ally or enemy from those war days. For example, the first season's final episode "A Nice Place To Visit" revolved around the team traveling to a small town to honor a fallen comrade and end up avenging his death, and in season two's "Recipe For Heavy Bread", a chance encounter leads the team to meet both the POW cook who helped them during the war, and the American officer who sold his unit out. Though he was affiliated with them during the war, the group's pilot "Howling Mad" Murdock was neither tried or involved in the bank robbery and is rather the group's secret member.

An article in the New Statesman (UK) published shortly after the premiere of The A-Team in the United Kingdom, also pointed out The A-Team's connection to the Vietnam War, characterizing it as the representation of the idealization of the Vietnam War, and an example of the war slowly becoming accepted and assimilated into American culture.

One of the team's primary antagonists, Col. Roderick Decker (Lance LeGault), had his past linked back to the Vietnam War in which he and Hannibal had come to fisticuffs in "the DOOM Club" (Da Nang Open Officers' Mess). At other times, members of the team would refer back to a certain tactic used during the War, which would be relevant to the team's present predicament. Often, Hannibal would refer to such a tactic, after which the other members of the team would complain about its failure during the War. This was also used to refer to some of Face's past accomplishments in scamming items for the team, such as in the first-season episode "Holiday In The Hills", in which Murdock fondly remembers Face being able to secure a '53 Cadillac while in the Vietnam jungle.

The team's ties to the Vietnam War were referred to again in the fourth-season finale, "The Sound of Thunder", in which the team is introduced to Tia (Tia Carrere), a war orphan and daughter of fourth season antagonist General Fulbright. Returning to Vietnam, Fulbright is shot in the back and gives his last words as he dies. The 2006 documentary Bring Back The A-Team joked that the scene lasted seven and a half minutes, but his death actually took a little over a minute. His murderer, a Vietnamese colonel, is killed in retaliation. Tia then returns with the team to the United States (see also: casting). This episode is notable for having one of the show's few truly serious dramatic moments, with each team member privately reminiscing on their war experiences, intercut with news footage from the war with Barry McGuire's Eve of Destruction playing in the background.

The show's ties to the Vietnam War are fully dealt with in the opening arc of the fifth season, dubbed "The Court-Martial (Part 1–3)", in which the team is finally court-martialed for the robbery of the bank of Hanoi. The character of Roderick Decker makes a return on the witness stand, and various newly introduced characters from the A-Team's past also make appearances. The team, after a string of setbacks, decides to plead guilty to the crime and they are sentenced to be executed. They escape this fate and come to work for a General Hunt Stockwell, leading into the remainder of the fifth season.

Episodes

The show ran for five seasons on the NBC television network, from January 23, 1983, to December 30, 1986 (with one additional, previously unbroadcast episode shown on March 8, 1987), for a total of 98 episodes.

Characters

The A-Team revolves around the four members of a former commando outfit, now mercenaries. Their leader is Lieutenant Colonel John "Hannibal" Smith (George Peppard), whose plans tend to be unorthodox, but effective. Lieutenant Templeton Peck (Dirk Benedict in the TV series, Tim Dunigan appeared as Templeton Peck in the pilot), usually called "Face" or "Faceman", is a smooth-talking con man who serves as the team's appropriator of vehicles and other useful items, as well as the team's second-in-command. The team's pilot is Captain H.M. "Howling Mad" Murdock (Dwight Schultz), who has been declared insane and lives in a Veterans' Affairs mental institution for the show's first four seasons. Finally, there is the team's strong man, mechanic and Sergeant First Class Bosco "B.A.", or "Bad Attitude", Baracus (Mr. T).

The team belonged to the 5th Special Forces as seen in the left side shoulder patch on Hannibal's uniform in the episode "A Nice Place To Visit". A patch on Hannibal's uniform on the right shoulder in that episode indicates he belonged to the 101st Airborne during a prior combat assignment, but that patch was replaced by the 1st Air Cavalry Division patch in the episode "Trial by Fire". The patch worn on the left sleeve according to uniform wear in the Army is the current assignment of the person wearing it and in the episode "A Nice Place to Visit" shows that the team was assigned to the Special Forces with a tab Airborne over the shoulder patch. Also their berets in that episode are green and have the tab of the 5th Special Forces in Vietnam on them. In the episode "West Coast Turnaround", Hannibal stated they were with the 5th Special Forces Group. Then, in the episode "Bad Time on the Border", Hannibal refers to his friends as "ex-Green Berets". Though the name they have adopted comes from the "A-Teams", the nickname coined for Special Forces Operational Detachments Alpha, these detachments usually consisted of twelve members; whether the four were considered a "detachment" of their own or had once had eight compatriots who were killed in action was never revealed. In the episode "A Nice Place to Visit" Ray Brenner is stated to have been a Major and part of Hannibal's team in Vietnam.

For its first season and the first half of the second season, the team was assisted by reporter Amy Amanda Allen (Melinda Culea). In the second half of the second season, Allen was replaced by fellow reporter Tawnia Baker (Marla Heasley). The character of Tia (Tia Carrere), a Vietnam war orphan now living in the United States, was meant to join the Team in the fifth season, but she was replaced by Frankie Santana (Eddie Velez), who served as the team's special effects expert. Velez was added to the opening credits of the fifth season after its second episode.

During their adventures, the A-Team was constantly met by opposition from the Military Police. In the show's first season, the MPs were led by Colonel Francis Lynch (William Lucking), but he was replaced for the second, third, and earlier fourth season by Colonel Roderick Decker (Lance LeGault) and his aide Captain Crane (Carl Franklin). Lynch returned for one episode in the show's third season ("Showdown!") but was not seen after. Decker was also briefly replaced by a Colonel Briggs (Charles Napier) in the third season for one episode ("Fire") when LeGault was unavailable but returned shortly after. For the latter portion of the show's fourth season, the team was hunted by General Harlan "Bull" Fulbright (Jack Ging), who would later hire the A-Team to find Tia in the season four finale, during which Fulbright was killed.

The fifth season introduced General Hunt Stockwell (Robert Vaughn) who, while serving as the team's primary antagonist, was also the team's boss and joined them on several missions. He was often assisted by Carla (Judith Ledford, sometimes credited as Judy Ledford).

Character traits
Lieutenant Colonel/Colonel John "Hannibal" Smith is "The Brains" for the A-Team, the tactician and leader of the team, and a cunning master of disguise. His most used disguise (on–screen only in pilot episode) is Mr. Lee, the dry cleaner, who performs one of the final parts of the client screening process, concluding by telling clients where to go to make direct contact with the A-Team. Smith dresses most often in a tan safari jacket and black leather gloves. He also is constantly seen smoking a cigar. Hannibal carries either a Browning Hi-Power, Colt M1911A1 or a Smith & Wesson Model 39 as a sidearm, most often "Mexican carried" (i.e. inside the waistband without a holster) although he uses a holster when on missions. His catchphrase is "I love it when a plan comes together." He is often said, usually by B.A., to be "on the jazz" when in the thrall of completing a mission.

Lieutenant Templeton "Faceman" Peck is "The Face" for the A-Team, and a master of the persuasive arts. The team's scrounger and con artist, he can get virtually anything he sets his mind to, usually exploiting women with sympathy-appeal and flirtation. He grew up an orphan, and is not without integrity, as stated by Murdock in the episode "Family Reunion": "He would rip the shirt off his back for you, and then scam one for himself." Faceman is also the A-Team's accountant. He dresses suavely, often appearing in suits, and can blend in well with the upper class, sometimes scamming luxury apartments for long terms, as well as regular visits to exclusive restaurants and invitations to opulent banquets, all on the basis of false identities he invents. Faceman carries a Colt Lawman Mk III revolver for protection, and drives a custom white 1984 Corvette with red trim, which he buys several episodes into the second season.

Sergeant Bosco "B.A." (Bad Attitude) Baracus is "The Muscle" for the A-Team, able to perform exceptional feats of strength. He is also the team's mechanic, master at arms, demolition and weapons specialist. Baracus affects a dislike for Murdock, calling him a "crazy fool", but his true feelings of friendship are revealed when he prevents Murdock from drowning in his desire to live like a fish. Baracus also has a deep aviophobia, and the others usually have to trick him and/or knock him out to get him on an aircraft. It is very rare that Baracus is awake while flying, and even rarer for him actually to consent to it. When he does, however, he then goes into a catatonic state. Baracus generally wears overalls and leopard or tiger print shirts in the early seasons, and wears a green jumpsuit in the later seasons. He is almost always seen with many gold chains and rings on every finger, and also wears a weightlifting belt. Baracus' hairstyle is always in a mohawk-like cut. He drives a customized black GMC van (actually black and metallic dark gray, with an angled red stripe between) that serves as the team's usual mode of transport.

Captain H.M. "Howling Mad" Murdock is the A-Team's resident pilot and can fly any kind of aircraft with considerable skill. However, due to a helicopter crash in Vietnam, Murdock apparently went insane. He lives in a Veterans' Hospital in the mental wing. Whenever the rest of the team requires a pilot, they have to break him out of the hospital, generally using Faceman to do so. In Seasons 1–4, Murdock has a different imaginary pet, imaginary friend, or alter-ego in each episode. When one of his imaginary pets or imaginary friends is killed by an enemy, Murdock usually snaps and takes revenge (but never kills). Baracus is annoyed and aggravated by Murdock's delusions and usually yells that his imagined pet, friend, or identity is not real, often making violent threats against Murdock if he persist; these threats are never carried out, but do have the effect of limiting Murdock's expression of his fantasies, perhaps just enough to keep them in check so that Murdock can do his job on the team. Many times, when Baracus is mad at Murdock for being crazy, Hannibal will side with Murdock in a sympathetic way. Murdock usually wears a leather flight jacket, a baseball cap, and basketball sneakers. Once he is discharged from the hospital in Season 5, Murdock has a different job each episode.

Casting
Although the part of Face was written by Frank Lupo and Stephen J. Cannell with Dirk Benedict in mind, NBC insisted that the part should be played by another actor.  Therefore, in the pilot, Face was portrayed by Tim Dunigan, who was later replaced by Benedict, with the comment that Dunigan was "too tall and too young". According to Dunigan: "I look even younger on camera than I am. So it was difficult to accept me as a veteran of the Vietnam War, which ended when I was a sophomore in high school."

Tia Carrere was intended to join the principal cast of the show in its fifth season after appearing in the season four finale, providing a tie to the team's inception during the war. Unfortunately for this plan, Carrere was under contract to General Hospital, which prevented her from joining The A-Team. Her character was abruptly dropped as a result.

According to Mr. T's account in Bring Back... The A-Team in 2006, the role of B. A. Baracus was written specifically for him. This is corroborated by Cannell's own account of the initial concept proposed by Tartikoff.

James Coburn, who co-starred in The Magnificent Seven, was considered for the role of Hannibal in The A-Team, while George Peppard (Hannibal) was the original consideration for the role of Vin (played by Steve McQueen instead) in The Magnificent Seven.  Robert Vaughn played one of main characters in the film.

Notable guest appearances 

Notable guest stars included:
 Claudia Christian as Cathy Rogers in "Trouble Brewing"
 Wendy Fulton as Kelly Stevens in "Bounty". Fulton and Dwight Schultz had married a few years before the episode, and the episode plays on the theme of Kelly and Murdock falling in love.
 Boy George as himself in "Cowboy George"
 Shecky Greene as himself roasting Gen. Harlan "Bull" Fulbright, in "Members Only"
 Isaac Hayes as C.J. Mack in "The Heart of Rock n' Roll"
 Hulk Hogan as himself in "Body Slam" and "The Trouble With Harry". In "Body Slam", other WWF wrestlers such as The British Bulldogs and "Mr Wonderful" Paul Orndorff also made cameo appearances.
 Ernie Hudson as Cal Freeman in "The Taxicab Wars"
 Rick James as himself in "The Heart of Rock n' Roll"
 Steven Keats in the episode "Harder than it Looks" before co-starring in All My Children
 Joanna Kerns as Trish Brenner in "A Nice Place To Visit"
 Yaphet Kotto as Charles F. Struthers in "The Out of Towners"
 David McCallum as Ivan Trigorin in "The Say U.N.C.L.E. Affair". McCallum guest stars as a former associate of Robert Vaughn's character General Stockwell. Vaughn and McCallum had co-starred together as friendly American and Russian secret agents in The Man from U.N.C.L.E.. This A-Team episode sent up many aspects of the classic series, such as Stockwell saying "Open Channel D" (an U.N.C.L.E. catchphrase).
 Joe Namath as T. J. Bryant in "Quarterback Sneak", season 5, episode 4
 Ana Obregón as Marta in double episode "Judgment Day"
 William "The Refrigerator" Perry as himself in "The Trouble With Harry"
 Markie Post as Rina Turian in "Hot Styles" and Sister Teresa/Leslie Becktall in "The Only Church in Town"
 Della Reese as Mrs. Baracus in "A Lease with an Option to Die"
 Pat Sajak as himself in "Wheel of Fortune"
 John Saxon as Martin James in "Children of Jamestown"
 Dean Stockwell as Officer Collins in "A Small & Deadly War"
 Professor Tanaka in episode "The Spy Who Mugged Me"
 William Windom as Al Massey in "Mexican Slayride" (Parts 1 & 2)
 Vanna White as herself in "Wheel of Fortune"

Reception
During the show's first three seasons, The A-Team managed to pull in an average of 20% to 24% of all American television households. The first regular episode ("Children of Jamestown"), reached 26.4% of the television watching audience, placing fourth in the top 10 rated shows, according to the Nielsen ratings.  By March, The A-Team, now on its regular Tuesday timeslot, dropped to the eighth spot, but rated a 20.5%.  During the sweeps week in May of that year, The A-Team dropped again but remained steady at 18.5%, and rose to 18.8% during the second week of May sweeps.  These were the highest ratings NBC had achieved in five years.  During the second season, the ratings continued to soar, reaching fourth place in the twenty-highest rated programs, behind Dallas and Simon & Simon, in January (mid-season), while during the third season, it was beaten out only by two other NBC shows, including The Cosby Show.

The fourth season saw The A-Team experience a dramatic fall in ratings, as it started to lose its position while television viewership increased. As such, the ratings, while stable, were relatively less. The season premiere ranked a 17.4% (a 26% audience share on that timeslot) on the Nielsen Rating scale, but ratings quickly declined after that. In October, The A-Team had fallen to 19th and by Super Bowl Night had fallen further, to 29th on the night where the show had originally scored its first hit three years earlier. For the remainder of its fourth season The A-Team managed to hang around the 20th spot, far from the top 10 position it had enjoyed during its first three seasons.

After four years on Tuesday, NBC decided to move The A-Team to a new timeslot on Friday for what would be its final season. Ratings continued to drop, and after seven episodes, The A-Team fell out of the top 50 altogether. In November 1986, NBC canceled the series, declining to order the last nine episodes of what would have been a 22-episode season. The final season ranked 61st with a 12.8 average rating.

Ratings

In syndication
The series has achieved cult status through heavy syndication in the U.S. and internationally. It has also remained popular overseas, such as in the United Kingdom, since it was first shown in July 1983. It is airing on satellite and cable channel Esquire Network. The series was to begin airing over NBC-TV's OTA digital subchannel network, Cozi TV, in January 2016.  Forces TV started showing the series every weekday since October 17, 2016. The series has been airing in Spanish on Telemundo-TV's OTA digital subchannel network, TeleXitos since December 2014. The series is available through Starz, ELREY, Tubi, COZI TV, and Peacock as of December 2021.  Peacock discontinued the availability of The A-Team at the end of February 2022. On May 29, 2022, The A-Team was added to the MeTV lineup with a special five-hour marathon before settling into the 6pm weeknight time slot on May 30, 2022. The series is available on the streaming service Tubi as of July 2022.

International
The A-Team has been broadcast all over the world; international response has been varied. In 1984, the main cast members of The A-Team, George Peppard, Mr. T, Dirk Benedict and Dwight Schultz were invited to the Netherlands. Peppard was the first to receive the invitation and thus thought the invitation applied only to him. When the other cast members were also invited, Peppard declined, leaving only Mr. T, Benedict and Schultz to visit the Netherlands. The immense turn-out for the stars was unforeseen, and they were forced to leave early as a security measure. A video was released with the present actors in which Schultz apologized and thanked everyone who had attended.

In Australia The A-Team was broadcast on Channel Ten. From 2010 7mate has been showing reruns of the show. The show was broadcast in New Zealand on TV2. In Brazil, the series was broadcast on SBT from 1984 to 1989, later moving to Rede Globo in the early 1990s. In the UK, the program was shown on ITV, starting on Friday, July 22, 1983; when it returned for its second run (resuming mid-second season) it moved to Saturday evenings. The series continued to be repeated on ITV until 1994. The series was later repeated on UK Gold from 1997 through 2007 at various times. It was also repeated on Bravo from 1997 to 1999. It returned to the channel in 2008 until the channel's closure in 2011. In 2017 the digital channel Spike began showing the series from the beginning. Channel 5 also repeated it in 2017. It is now shown in the UK on comedy channel Comedy Central.

Although ratings soared during its early seasons, many US television critics described the show largely as cartoonish and thereby wrote the series off. Most reviews focused on acting and the formulaic nature of the episodes, most prominently the absence of actual killing in a show about Vietnam War veterans.

The show was a huge hit in Italy in the mid-1980s to the 1990s. In Indonesia, The A-Team also gained success as a big hit since the television network RCTI aired the show in December 1989 until 1994.

On-screen violence
The violence presented in The A-Team is highly sanitized. People do not bleed or (usually) bruise when hit (though they might develop a limp or require a sling), nor do the members of the A-Team kill people. The results of violence were only ever presented when it was required for the script. In almost every car crash there is a short take showing the occupants of the vehicle climbing out of the mangled or burning wreck, even in helicopter crashes. However, more of these types of takes were dropped near the end of the fourth season. According to Stephen J. Cannell, co-creator of the show, this part of the show did become a running joke for the writing staff and they would at times test the limits of believability on purpose.

The show has been described as cartoonish and likened to Tom and Jerry.  Dean P. of the Courier-Mail described the violence in the show as "hypocritical" and that "the morality of giving the impression that a hail of bullets does no-one any harm is ignored. After all, Tom and Jerry survived all sorts of mayhem for years with no ill-effects." Television reviewer Ric Meyers joked that the A-Team used "antineutron bullets—they destroy property for miles around, but never harm a human being".  According to certain estimates, an episode of The A-Team held up to 46 violent acts. Cannell responds: "They were determined to make a point, and we were too big a target to resist. Cartoon violence is a scapegoat issue." Originally, The A-Team's status as a hit show remained strong, but it ultimately lost out to more family-oriented shows such as The Cosby Show, Who's the Boss? and Growing Pains.  John J. O'Connor of The New York Times wrote in a 1986 article that "...a substantial number of viewers, if the ratings in recent months are to be believed, are clearly fed up with mindless violence of the car-chasing, fist-slugging variety".

GMC Vandura

The 1983 GMC Vandura van used by the A-Team, with its characteristic red stripe, black and red turbine mag wheels, and rooftop spoiler, has become an enduring pop culture icon. The customized 1994 Chevrolet G20 used on The A-Team movie was also on display at the 2010 New York International Auto Show.

A number of devices were seen in the back of the van in different episodes, including a mini printing press ("Pros and Cons"), an audio surveillance recording device ("A Small and Deadly War"), Hannibal's disguise kits in various episodes, and a gun storage locker.

Early examples of the van had a red GMC logo on the front grille, and an additional GMC logo on the rear left door. Early in the second season, these logos were blacked out, although GMC continued to supply vans and receive a credit on the closing credits of each episode.

The van was almost all-black, as the section above the red stripe was metallic gray. The angle of the rear spoiler can also be seen to vary on different examples of the van within the series. Additionally, some versions of the van have a sunroof, whereas others, typically those used for stunts do not. This led to continuity errors in some episodes, such as in the third season's "The Bells of St. Mary's", in a scene where Face jumps from a building onto the roof of the van with no sunroof but moments later, in an interior studio shot, climbs in through the sunroof.

Merchandise
The huge success of the series saw a vast array of merchandise, including toys and snacks released both in America and internationally. There were several sets of trading cards and stickers, action figures of the characters were produced by Galoob as well as vehicles, including B.A.'s van and Face's Corvette (available in several different sizes), as well as items such as helicopters, trucks and jeeps to fit in with the line, from model car manufacturer Ertl. Some of the other array of items available included jigsaw puzzles, View-Master reels containing 21 3-D pictures (over three reels) of the second season A-Team story "When You Comin' Back, Range Rider?", was produced by View-Master International (available both as a pack of reels, and also as a "gift set" with 3-D viewer), an electric race car track with A-Team vehicle covers instead of normal cars, and a TYCO produced train set with various accessories and pieces themed for the A-Team look. The set includes a Baldwin shark nose engine painted up like the Van and a matching Caboose. 
Following the original cancellation of the series, further merchandise has appeared as the series has achieved cult status, including an A-Team van by "Hot Wheels". In 2016 Lego released a pack that includes a B.A. Baracus minifigure and constructible van; the pack unlocks additional A-Team themed content in the video game Lego Dimensions, including all four team members as playable characters.

Comics

Marvel Comics produced a three-issue A-Team comic book series, which was later reprinted as a trade paperback. Similarly, in the United Kingdom, an A-Team comic strip appeared for several years in the 1980s as part of the children's television magazine and comic Look-In, to tie in with the British run of the series. It was preceded, though, by a short run in the final year (1984) of TV Comic, drawn by Jim Eldridge.

Parody
The group was called the "B-Team" in a parody story in E-Man in 1984.

Books
Several novels were based on the series, the first six published in America by Dell and in Britain by Target Books; the last four were only published in Britain. The first six are credited to Charles Heath. The books are generally found in paperback form, although hardback copies (with different cover artwork) were also released.
 The A-Team (adapted from the pilot written by Frank Lupo and Stephen J. Cannell)
 Small But Deadly Wars (adapted from the episodes "A Small and Deadly War" written by Lupo and "Black Day at Bad Rock" written by Patrick Hasburgh)
 When You Comin' Back, Range Rider? (adapted from the episode of the same name written by Lupo)
 Old Scores to Settle (adapted from the episodes "The Only Church in Town" written by Babs Greyhosky and "Recipe for Heavy Bread" written by Cannell, although the novel features the latter episode first)
 Ten Percent of Trouble (adapted from the episodes "Steel" written by Lupo and "The Maltese Cow" written by Thomas Szollosi and Richard Christian Matheson)
 Operation Desert Sun: The Untold Story, credited on the cover to Charles Heath but on the title page to Louis Chunovic. (This is an original story that tells of the events of the mission that got the team sent to prison for a crime they didn't commit.)
 Bullets, Bikinis and Bells by Ron Renauld (adapted from the episodes "Bullets and Bikinis" written by Mark Jones and "The Bells of St. Mary's" written by Cannell)
 Backwoods Menace by Ron Renauld (adapted from the episodes "Timber!" written by Jeff Ray, and "Children of Jamestown" written by Cannell)
 The Bend in the River by David George Deutsch (adapted from the episode of the same name written by Cannell and Lupo)
 Death Vows by Max Hart (adapted from the episode "Till Death Us Do Part" written by Greyhosky) – This is the only book in the series to be based on one standard-length episode.
 Two "Choose Your Own Adventure|Plot-your-own-adventure" books, where the reader would read a section of text and choose from several options of what to do next, were also released as part of the same range, again only available in Britain.

In the United Kingdom from 1985 to 1988, four Annuals were produced, each consisting of text and comic strip stories, puzzles, and photos of the show's stars, with a further one produced by Marvel Comics consisting of several reprinted comic strips, released in 1989/1990.

A Panini set of stickers, which adapted six TV episodes (from the first and earlier second season) using shots from the episodes, could be stuck into an accompanying book, with text under each inserted sticker to narrate the story.

Theme song and soundtrack
The original main theme composed by Mike Post and Pete Carpenter (in a performance credited to Post) was released on the vinyl LP Mike Post – Television Theme Songs (Elektra Records E1-60028Y, 1982) and again on the Mike Post – Mike Post LP (RCA Records AFL1-5183, 1984), both long out-of-print; however, this was not the same version of the theme as heard on-screen. The theme, as heard on seasons two through four (including the opening narration and sound effects), was also released on TVT's Television's Greatest Hits: 70s and 80s. A 7-inch single of the song credited to Post was released on RCA in 1984.

The French version of the song had lyrics, which mirrored the spoken description of the show in the English opening credits. The theme has been ranked among the best TV themes ever written, with TV weatherman Al Roker sharing that opinion, and using the song to "get jazzed up" in the morning.

Though no original music other than the theme has been released, in 1984 EMI issued an album of re-recorded material from the series conducted by Daniel Caine (reissued by Silva Screen on compact disc in 1999, SILVAD 3509).

 Theme from The A-Team (3:13)
 Young Hannibal (2:57)
 B. A.'s Ride (2:34)
 The A-Team In New York City (2:43)
 Bandits (2:08)
 Taxi Chase (2:13)
 The A-Team Escape (1:16)
 The A-Team Prepare For War (2:08)
 Showtime (3:22)
 Move, Sucker (1:04)
 Let's Get Busted (1:06)
 Murdock's "Face" (3:01)
 Helicopters (2:36)
 More Bandits (1:22)
 Theme From The A-Team (3:27)

Production notes

Filming
The series was co produced by former actor John Ashley who also provided the opening narration to the movie.

Awards
During its time, The A-Team was nominated for three Emmy Awards: In 1983 (Outstanding Film Sound Mixing for a Series) for the pilot episode, in 1984 (Outstanding Film Sound Mixing for a Series) for the episode "When You Comin' Back, Range Rider?" and in 1987 (Outstanding Sound Editing for a Series) for the episode "Firing Line".

Professional wrestlers
The show featured professional wrestlers such as Hulk Hogan, Professor Toru Tanaka, Ricky "The Dragon" Steamboat, The Dynamite Kid, Bobby "The Brain" Heenan, Davey Boy Smith (The British Bulldog), Big John Studd and Greg "The Hammer" Valentine, in most cases playing themselves. In the episode "Body Slam" (which featured Hogan) wrestling interviewer and announcer "Mean" Gene Okerlund also appeared.

In addition, the music video for John Cena's "Bad, Bad Man" (on Cena's You Can't See Me album) featured the Chain Gang as a three-man A-Team—Cena as Hannibal, plus Cena's cousin Tha Trademarc as Howling Mad and Bumpy Knuckles as B.A.

Weapons
In early episodes the team used Colt AR-15 SP1 semi-automatic rifles (with automatic sound effects, simulating the M16), while in later seasons they used the Ruger Mini-14, and on rare occasions, the selective fire AC-556K variant of the Mini-14. Hannibal is also seen using an M60 machine gun (which Hannibal called "Baby") in some episodes as well as a Micro-Uzi. MAC-11s with parts added to simulate the Uzi appear in at least two early episodes. Hannibal's sidearms are either a nickel-plated Smith & Wesson Model 59, or a stainless steel Smith & Wesson Model 639. Unusually in the episode "Black Day at Bad Rock" he is seen carrying a Browning Hi-Power. Face's usual sidearm is a Colt Lawman Mk III, though he does use Smith & Wesson revolvers in latter seasons. Many antagonists and members of the team are seen using 1911s as well. Starting from Season 4, the then-exotic Steyr AUG bullpup rifle also became prominent in the series. "So many different firearms were used in the 1980s hit 'The A-Team' that it's impossible to list them all. For five seasons, the wrongly accused foursome used rifles, handguns, submachine guns and shotguns to bring justice for the little guy while trying to stay out of jail. Regardless of the number of explosions or rounds fired, nobody ever got seriously hurt except for the occasional flesh wound of a team member." As a result, the American Rifleman declared The A-Team the Number One Show on Television to regularly feature firearms.

Home Media: DVD and Blu-Ray

DVD
Universal Studios has released all five seasons of The A-Team on DVD in Region 1, 2, and 4. In Region 2, a complete series set entitled The A-Team--The Ultimate Collection was released on October 8, 2007. A complete series set was released in Region 1 on June 8, 2010. The set includes 25 discs packaged in a replica of the A-Team's signature black van from the show. The complete series set was released in Region 4 on November 3, 2010.

Blu-Ray: Fabulous Films
All 5 seasons were re-released in Region 2 with new packaging on June 21, 2010. The series has been remastered and was released on Blu-ray disc in the United Kingdom by Fabulous Films on October 17, 2016.

Blu-Ray: Elephant Films
On September 28, 2021, Universal Studios worked with the French Company, Elephant Films to release the complete Blu-ray set in France.  The Blu-ray discs are Region Free (Region A/B/C) and will play on any Blu-ray player in the world.  The set has the original English versions and the French dubbed versions.  The box set comes with a big booklet & episode guide which is mostly in French but does have some English printing in the episode guide, and has many color pictures from the series.  While the set is from France, there is a USA link from Amazon.com for USA residents to buy the set.

Bring Back... The A-Team (2006)
On May 18, 2006, Channel 4 in the UK attempted to reunite the surviving cast members of The A-Team for the show Bring Back... in an episode titled "Bring Back...The A-Team". Justin Lee Collins presented the challenge, securing interviews and appearances from Dirk Benedict, Dwight Schultz, Marla Heasley, Jack Ging, series co-creator Stephen Cannell, and Mr. T.

Collins eventually managed to bring together Benedict, Schultz, Heasley, Ging and Cannell, along with William Lucking, Lance LeGault, and George Peppard's son, Christian. Mr. T was unable to make the meeting, which took place in the Friar's Club in Beverly Hills, but he did manage to appear on the show for a brief talk with Collins.

Feature film

A feature film based on The A-Team was released on June 11, 2010, and was produced by 20th Century Fox. The film stars Liam Neeson as Hannibal, Bradley Cooper as Faceman, Quinton Jackson as B.A. and Sharlto Copley as Murdock with Jessica Biel as the team's ally and Patrick Wilson as the film's villain, Agent Lynch while both Dirk Benedict (Faceman) and Dwight Schultz (Murdock) made brief cameo appearances in the film (as a prisoner using a sunbed and a psychiatrist overseeing Murdock's shock therapy, respectively); because of timing issues, these scenes were moved to the end of the credits. They were later reinserted for the extended-cut of the film.

Reboot series
In September 2015, Fox announced that they were developing a reboot A-Team series with Chris Morgan as executive producer with Cannell's daughter, Tawnia McKiernan, and Albert Kim writing. The team is to be made up of both male and female characters.

See also
 1983 in American television
 Mercenaries in popular culture
 T.H.E. Cat''—a forerunner of the "expert(s) help(s) people in trouble" genre
 United States Army Special Forces in popular culture

References

Specific

General

 .

External links

; contains information on episodes, cast, etc.

1980s American drama television series
1983 American television series debuts
1987 American television series endings
American action adventure television series
American action television series
American adventure television series
American military television series
English-language television shows
Fictional mercenaries
Fictional quartets
Marvel Comics titles
NBC original programming
Super Bowl lead-out shows
Television shows adapted into comics
Television shows adapted into films
Television shows adapted into novels
Television shows adapted into video games
Television shows filmed in Florida
Television shows set in Los Angeles
Television series by Stephen J. Cannell Productions
Television series by Universal Television
Television series about Vietnam War
Television series created by Stephen J. Cannell
Television series created by Frank Lupo

Wrongful convictions in fiction